Pseudo bit error ratio (PBER) in adaptive high-frequency (HF) radio, is a bit error ratio derived by a majority decoder that processes redundant transmissions. 

Note:  In adaptive HF radio automatic link establishment, PBER is determined by the extent of error correction, such as by using the fraction of non-unanimous votes in the 2-of-3 majority decoder. 

Engineering ratios
Error detection and correction